Protein MIS12 homolog is a protein that in humans is encoded by the MIS12 gene.

Interactions
MIS12 has been shown to interact with NSL1, ZWINT, CASC5, Polyamine-modulated factor 1, NDC80, DSN1 and CBX5.

References

Further reading